Cawthon is an unincorporated community in Brazos County, in the U.S. state of Texas. According to the Handbook of Texas, the community had a population of 75 in 2000. It is located within the Bryan-College Station metropolitan area.

History
Cawthon was first settled after the American Civil War and was a part of Stephen F. Austin's colony. When the International and Great Northern Railroad built a track through the area from Navasota to Hearne in the early 1900s, the Cawthon townsite was established. It was named for local settler Will Cawthon. A post office was established at Cawthon in 1912 and remained in operation until 1956. The community had two general stores, a physician, a butcher, a blacksmith, and an express and telegraph agent for the railroad, as well as 25 residents in 1925. There was only one store and a population of 10 in 1940. There was a church, two businesses, and several scattered houses on the 1948 county highway map. The population grew to 75 in 1964 with no businesses. In 1990, Cawthon had several scattered farms, the railroad depot, and 75 residents, which remained at that figure in 2000.

Geography

Education
Cawthon had its own school in 1948. Today, the community is served by the Navasota Independent School District.

References

Unincorporated communities in Brazos County, Texas
Unincorporated communities in Texas